Romar may refer to
Romar (surname)
Romar Entertainment, a California-based film distribution company 
Rohrbach Romar, a German long-range commercial flying-boat